Loris Dominissini (19 November 1961 – 4 June 2021) was an Italian professional football player and manager.

Career
Born in Udine, Dominissini played as a midfielder for Udinese, Triestina, Pordenone, Messina, Pistoiese, Reggiana, Sevegliano and Pro Gorizia.

After retiring as a player he managed Udinese, Como, Ascoli, Spezia, Pro Patria, Reggiana and Visé.

Death
Dominissini died from COVID-19 during the COVID-19 pandemic in Italy in June 2021.

References

External links
 

1961 births
2021 deaths
Italian footballers
Udinese Calcio players
U.S. Triestina Calcio 1918 players
Pordenone Calcio players
A.C.R. Messina players
U.S. Pistoiese 1921 players
A.C. Reggiana 1919 players
A.S.D. Sevegliano players
A.S. Pro Gorizia players
Serie C players
Serie B players
Serie A players
Association football midfielders
Italian football managers
Udinese Calcio managers
Como 1907 managers
Ascoli Calcio 1898 F.C. managers
Spezia Calcio managers
Aurora Pro Patria 1919 managers
A.C. Reggiana 1919 managers
C.S. Visé managers
Sportspeople from Udine
Italian expatriate football managers
Italian expatriate sportspeople in Belgium
Expatriate football managers in Belgium
Deaths from the COVID-19 pandemic in Friuli Venezia Giulia
Footballers from Friuli Venezia Giulia